Vida nocturna is a 1955 Argentine film.

Cast

External links
 

1955 films
1950s Spanish-language films
Argentine black-and-white films
Films directed by Leo Fleider
Argentine comedy films
1955 comedy films
1950s Argentine films